Xylota heinrichi is a species of hoverfly in the family Syrphidae.

Distribution
Tanzania.

References

Eristalinae
Insects described in 1986
Diptera of Africa